Lari Pesonen (born 28 January 1995) is a Finnish sport shooter, born in Juuka. He represented Finland at the 2020 Summer Olympics in Tokyo 2021, competing in men's skeet.

References

External links

1995 births
Living people
People from Juuka
Finnish male sport shooters
Shooters at the 2020 Summer Olympics
Olympic shooters of Finland
Sportspeople from North Karelia